Fray Domingo de Santo Tomás, O.P. (1499 – 28 February 1570) was a Spanish Dominican missionary, bishop, and grammarian in the Viceroyalty of Peru. He compiled the first Quechua language grammar, published in 1560, and that same year published a work on the vocabulary of Quechua.

Early life
Santo Tomás was born in Seville, Spain in 1499. He was educated in local church schools and entered the Dominican Order as a youth. After he was ordained as a priest and had served in Spain for years, he was assigned as a missionary to the Spanish colonial Viceroyalty of Peru in 1540, soon after the initial conquest of 1533. He founded the convent (monastery) and city of Yungay on 4 August 1540 to evangelize to the Inca.

Missionary work
For the purpose of Indian Reductions, by which the Spanish brought natives together around missions for teaching and work, Domingo learned the Quechua dialect that was spoken along the Peruvian coast near Lima. The coastal dialect of Quechua was significantly different from the one in Cuzco, as was detailed by Diego González Holguín in the early 17th century. In 1545, Domingo was elected prior of the Convento del Santísimo Rosario in Lima. In 1549, he created the "Tasa" of Lima, with Fray Jeronimo de Loayza and Fray Tomás de San Martín. In 1560 he published his Grammatica o arte de la lengua general de los Indios de los Reynos del Peru (a Quechua grammar) in Valladolid, Spain. In the same year, he published his Lexicon, o Vocabulario de la lengua general del Peru.

On 6 Jul 1562, he was appointed by Pope Pius IV as Bishop of La Plata o Charcas. On 26 Dec 1562, he was consecrated bishop by Jerónimo de Loaysa, Archbishop of Lima. He served as Bishop of La Plata o Charcas until his death in December 1570 in La Plata (Sucre), the Bolivia region of the Viceroyalty of Peru.

Works

 Grammatica o arte de la lengua general de los Indios de los Reynos del Peru (Valladolid, 1560).
 Lexicon, o Vocabulario de la lengua general del Peru (Valladolid, 1560).
 Plática para todos los Indios (1560).

References

External links and additional sources
 (for Chronology of Bishops) 
 (for Chronology of Bishops) 
Digital facsimiles of works by Domingo de Santo Tomás from the John Carter Brown Library on Internet Archive

16th-century linguists
Linguists from Peru
Linguists from Spain
Santo Tomás
16th-century Roman Catholic bishops in Bolivia
Viceroyalty of Peru people
1499 births
1570 deaths
16th-century Spanish Roman Catholic priests
16th-century Peruvian Roman Catholic priests
Spanish Dominicans
Missionary linguists
Bishops appointed by Pope Pius IV
Dominican bishops
Roman Catholic bishops of Sucre